The national flag of Mali is a tricolour with three equal vertical stripes. From the hoist (the place where the flagpole meets the flag) the colours are green, gold, and red, the pan-African colours.  The flag of Mali is almost identical to the flag of Guinea, with the exception that the colours are in reverse order.

History 
The current flag was adopted on March 1, 1961. The original flag was adopted on April 4, 1959, when Mali joined the Mali Federation. This flag was the same, except the golden stripe had a black kanaga, a shape of a squatter man with arms raised to the sky. The figure was removed due to the opposition,  in a country whose population is 90% Muslim,  of Islamic fundamentalists (see Aniconism in Islam, the belief against making pictures of the human figure).

Symbolism 
The green stands for fertility of the land, gold stands for purity and mineral wealth, and the red symbolizes the blood shed for independence from the French.

Colour scheme

Historical flags

Other flags

See also 
 Coat of arms of Mali
 Pan-African colours

Notes

References

External links
 

Flag
Flags of Africa
Flags introduced in 1961
Mali
Flags of Mali